South Bend Township is a township in Blue Earth County, Minnesota, United States. The population was 1,682 as of the 2010 census.

History
South Bend Township was organized in 1858, and named from a meander in the Minnesota River.

Geography
Public Land Survey System (PLSS) of the United States: Township 108 North, Range 27 West, Fifth Meridian, 23,092 Acres. The Minnesota River forms the township's northern border, and one of its tributaries, the Blue Earth River, forms the eastern boundary. South Bend is bordered by Judson Township on the west side, Rapidan Township on the south side, and Mankato Township on the east side (separated by the Blue Earth River). In the late 1800s the portion of South Bend Township east of the Blue Earth River was designated as part of Mankato Township.

Local government
South Bend Township has a governing Board of Supervisors. There are five Supervisors, elected at-large by the electorate of the township, each serving a three-year term. The Board appoints a Township Clerk who also serves as Township Treasurer. The township is the only township of the 23 Blue Earth County townships to support its own volunteer fire department. A portion of the township is served by township sanitary sewer and potable water.

The west half of the city of Skyline is within this township geographically but is a separate entity.

Unincorporated community
 LeHillier at

Major highways
 U.S. Highway 169
  Minnesota State Highway 60
  Minnesota State Highway 66
  Minnesota State Highway 68

Lake
 Rush Lake (eastern half)

Adjacent townships
 Belgrade Township, Nicollet County (north)
 Mankato Township (east)
 Rapidan Township (south)
 Garden City Township (southwest)
 Judson Township (west)
 Nicollet Township, Nicollet County (northwest)

Cemetery
The township contains Minneopa Cemetery.

Demographics
As of the census of 2000, there were 1,491 people, 527 households, and 359 families residing in the township. The racial makeup of the township was 97.32% White, 0.13% African American, 0.27% Native American, 0.47% Asian, 1.14% from other races, and 0.67% from two or more races. Hispanic or Latino of any race were 2.62% of the population.

There were 527 households, out of which 31.9% had children under the age of 18 living with them, 55.6% were married couples living together, 8.2% had a female householder with no husband present, and 31.7% were non-families. 22.6% of all households were made up of individuals, and 6.1% had someone living alone who was 65 years of age or older.  The average household size was 2.60 and the average family size was 3.04.

In the township the population was spread out, with 22.8% under the age of 18, 9.9% from 18 to 24, 26.4% from 25 to 44, 22.7% from 45 to 64, and 18.2% who were 65 years of age or older.  The median age was 40 years. For every 100 females, there were 104.0 males.  For every 100 females age 18 and over, there were 102.3 males.

The median income for a household in the township was $42,083, and the median income for a family was $46,719. Males had a median income of $33,889 versus $23,239 for females. The per capita income for the township was $18,038.  About 5.5% of families and 7.2% of the population were below the poverty line, including 7.0% of those under age 18 and 4.1% of those age 65 or over.

References
 United States National Atlas
 United States Census Bureau 2007 TIGER/Line Shapefiles
 United States Board on Geographic Names (GNIS)

Townships in Blue Earth County, Minnesota
Mankato – North Mankato metropolitan area
Townships in Minnesota